Mariella Nava, stage name of  Maria Giuliana Nava (born 3 February 1960) is an Italian singer-songwriter and composer.

Life and career 
Born in Taranto, Nava made her official debut as a songwriter in 1985 with the song "Questi figli", which she had  sent by mail to Gianni Morandi and which Morandi included in his album Uno su mille. In 1987 she started a long collaboration with the producers Antonio Coggio and Roberto Davini; the same year she debuted at the Sanremo Music Festival with the song "Fai piano". 

Between 1987 and 2005 Nava entered the competition at the Sanremo Festival eight times, ranking third in 1999 with the song "Così è la vita". As a songwriter, she collaborated with Andrea Bocelli, Renato Zero, Lucio Dalla, Mango, Amii Stewart, Ornella Vanoni, Loredana Bertè, Eduardo De Crescenzo, Mietta, Gigi D'Alessio among others. In 2005 her song "It's Forever", sung in a duet with Dionne Warwick, was chosen as the official song of the FIS Alpine World Ski Championships held in Bormio.

Discography

Album    
     1988 - Per paura o per amore
     1989 - Il giorno e la notte
     1991 - Crescendo
     1992 - Mendicante e altre storie
     1994 - Scrivo
      1994 - Uscire (collection with an unpublished song) 
     1998 - Dimmi che mi vuoi bene
     1999 - Così è la vita
     2000 - Pazza di te
     2002 - Questa sono io
     2004 - Condivisioni
     2007 - Dentro una rosa
     2012 - Tempo mosso
      2013 - Sanremo si, Sanremo no (collection with two unpublished songs)
      2017 - Epoca

References

External links 

 
 
 Mariella Nava at Discogs
 

People from Taranto
1960 births
Italian pop singers 
Italian women singers
Living people
Italian songwriters